Marju (12 March 1988 – 11 October 2016) was a Thoroughbred racehorse and sire.

Background
Marju was a dark bay or brown horse bred by Kilcarn Stud and owned by Hamdan Al Maktoum. He was sired by Last Tycoon out of Flame of Tara. He was a half-brother to Group One winner Salsabil.

Racing career
Trained by John Dunlop, Marju raced 7 times during his career and was ridden by Willie Carson each time. He won 3 races including the Craven Stakes and the St. James's Palace Stakes, as well as finishing second to Generous in the 1991 Epsom Derby. He won a total prize money of £282,640.

Stud record
Retired to stud duty at Derrinstown Stud, Ireland in 1992 Shuttled to New Zealand in 2000 and Australia in 2001-02 Pensioned at Derrinstown Stud, Ireland in 2011, Marju sired a number of stakes winners including the Soviet Song, My Emma, Sil Sila, Satono Crown, Viva Pataca and Indigenous. He is the grandsire of Ramonti. He died of natural causes at his owner's Derrinstown Stud in Ireland on 11 October 2016.
After his death, the last crop Japanese horse Satono Crown honored Hong Kong Vase.

References

1988 racehorse births
2016 racehorse deaths
Racehorses trained in the United Kingdom
Racehorses bred in Ireland
Thoroughbred family 2-f